Raymond T. Erney Jr. is a former American football and baseball coach.  He was the 31st head football coach at Dickinson College in Carlisle, Pennsylvania, serving for four seasons, from 1980 to 1983, and compiling a record of 5–30–1.

Head coaching record

College

References

Year of birth missing (living people)
Living people
American football centers
Dickinson Red Devils baseball coaches
Dickinson Red Devils football coaches
Juniata Eagles football players
High school football coaches in Pennsylvania
Players of American football from Harrisburg, Pennsylvania